Vasileuți is a commune in Rîșcani District, Moldova. It is composed of six villages: Armanca, Ciubara, Mihăilenii Noi, Moșeni, Știubeieni and Vasileuți.

References

Communes of Rîșcani District